Truman is a surname of English origin. Notable people with the name include:

Sir Benjamin Truman (1700–1780), English entrepreneur and brewer
Benjamin C. Truman (1835–1916), American journalist and author
Bess Truman (1885–1982), wife of President Truman
Charles Truman (1949–2017), British art historian and curator
Christine Truman (born 1941), British tennis player
David Truman (1913–2003), American academic
Edwin M. Truman (born 1941), American economist
Harry Truman (disambiguation)
Harry R. Truman (1896–1980), American victim of the 1980 eruption of Mount St. Helens
Harry S. Truman (1884–1972), 33rd U.S. president
James Truman (disambiguation)
James S. Truman (1874–1957), New York state senator
Joseph Truman (born 1997), British Sportsperson
Louis Truman (1908–2004), American general
Lyman Truman (1806–1881), New York state senator
Margaret Truman (1924–2008), American writer, daughter of President Truman
Michael Truman (1916–1972), British film producer
Ralph Truman (1900–1977), British actor
Timothy Truman (born 1956), American writer

Fictional characters
 Will Truman, fictional character in the television series Will and Grace
 Scott Truman, fictional character in the television series Power Rangers RPM

See also
Senator Truman (disambiguation)
Trueman, surname
Truman (given name)

References

Surnames
Surnames of English origin
English-language surnames